South Korea, as Republic of Korea, competed at the 2002 Winter Olympics in Salt Lake City, United States.

Medalists

Alpine skiing

Men

Women

Biathlon

Men

Women

Cross-country skiing

Men

Women

Figure skating

Men

Women

Mixed

Luge

Men

Short track speed skating

Men

Women

Skeleton

Men

Ski jumping

Men

Speed skating

Men

Women

References
Official Olympic Reports
International Olympic Committee results database

Korea, South
2002
Winter Olympics